Nuestra Belleza Coahuila 2010, was held at the Teatro Nazas in Torreón, Coahuila on July 30, 2010. At the conclusion of the final night of competition, Cecilia Flores of Torreón was crowned the winner. Flores  was crowned by outgoing Nuestra Belleza Coahuila titleholder, Abril Rodríguez. Ten contestants competed for the state title.

Results

Placements

Special awards

Judges
Javier Ruíz
Perla Beltrán - Nuestra Belleza Mundo México 2008
René Strickler - Actor
Héctor Javier Pérez
Abril Cervera
Ana Laura Corral - National Coordinator of Nuestra Belleza México

Background Music
Jot Dog

Contestants

References

External links
Official Website

Nuestra Belleza México